"Love to Love You" is a song by Celtic folk rock band the Corrs, the fourth single from their debut album Forgiven, Not Forgotten. It was released in September 1996, peaking at number 62 on the UK Singles Chart and reaching the top 50 in Australia and New Zealand. In the UK, it was issued as a double A-side with a re-release of "Runaway".

Music video

The video for the fourth single is a compilation of some concert footage filmed at live gigs and some behind the scenes footage at photo shoots in and around Dublin in July 1996, interspersed with short clips of The Corrs on board an aircraft carrier. There wasn't enough time to make a more complicated video.

Most of the scenes in the video can also be found in the documentary "The Right Time". The scenes on the American aircraft carrier called "John F. Kennedy" which was then located in Dublin Bay are also featured in the aforementioned documentary.

Director Ciaran Tanham, who also directed "The Right Time" documentary and was one of the directors of the "Lansdowne Road" concert.

Track listings
UK and European CD single; Australian CD and cassette single
 "Love to Love You" (radio edit) – 3:21
 "Rainy Day" – 4:02
 "Carraroe Jig" (full length version) – 3:56

UK cassette single
 "Love to Love You" (radio edit) – 3:21
 "Rainy Day" – 4:02

Charts

Release history

References

1995 songs
1996 singles
Atlantic Records singles
The Corrs songs
Lava Records singles
Song recordings produced by David Foster
Songs written by Andrea Corr
Songs written by Caroline Corr
Songs written by Jim Corr
Songs written by Sharon Corr